Støylen is a surname. Notable people with the surname include:

André Støylen (born 1968), Norwegian politician
Bernt Støylen (1858–1937), Norwegian theologian and psalmist
Kaare Støylen (1909–1989), Norwegian theologian and priest

Norwegian-language surnames